This is a recap of the 1990 season for the Professional Bowlers Association (PBA) Tour.  It was the tour's 32nd season, and consisted of 37 events. Amleto Monacelli repeated as PBA Player of the Year, winning another three titles on top of the four he had won in 1989.

Jim Pencak won his second title and first major at the Society Bank PBA National Championship. By also winning the Budweiser Open and Showboat Atlantic City Open later in the season, Pencak set a PBA record by winning the first 15 TV matches of his career.

Ron Polombi, Jr. won a major at the Seagram's Coolers U.S. Open, while Dave Ferraro was victorious at the Firestone Tournament of Champions.

Tournament schedule

References

External links
1990 Season Schedule

Professional Bowlers Association seasons
1990 in bowling